The 2019–20 Handball-Bundesliga was the 55th season of the Handball-Bundesliga, Germany's premier handball league and the 43rd season consisting of only one league. It ran from 22 August 2019 until it was cancelled in April 2020.

Due to the COVID-19 pandemic the league postponed the league until late April. On 3 April, it was suspended until 16 May.

On 21 April 2020, the season was eventually cancelled. THW Kiel was declared the champion.

Teams

Team changes

Stadiums

Standings
The season was cancelled on 21 April 2020. The final season placings were determined by points per game. There were no relegations to the 2nd division.

Results

Statistics

Top goalscorers

Top goalkeepers

References

External links
Official website 

Handball-Bundesliga
2019–20 domestic handball leagues
2019 in German sport
2020 in German sport
Handball-Bundesliga